Morea is a historic home located at Charlottesville, Virginia. It was built in 1835, and is a -story, three bay, vernacular brick dwelling. It features an original recessed second-story verandah, an interior structural arcade, and a semidetached office wing.  It is the only surviving dwelling built by one of the original University of Virginia faculty members approved by Thomas Jefferson. Its owner, John Patten Emmet, was the school's first professor of natural history. It is now owned by the University of Virginia and serves as the co-residence for both the Principal and the Director of Studies of the International Residential College.

It was listed on the National Register of Historic Places in 1984.

References

Houses on the National Register of Historic Places in Virginia
Houses completed in 1835
Houses in Charlottesville, Virginia
National Register of Historic Places in Charlottesville, Virginia